Tight Quarters is a 1983 Hungarian drama film directed by György Szomjas. It was entered into the 34th Berlin International Film Festival.

Cast
 Mariann Erdös as Éva (as Erdõs Mariann)
 Nóra Görbe as Éva (voice)
 Károly Eperjes as Csaba
 Péter Andorai as Miklós
 Edit Ábrahám as Zsuzsa
 Vera Molnar as Jutka
 Gergely Bikácsy as Szomszéd
 Erzsi Cserhalmi as Kolléganõ

References

External links

1983 films
1980s Hungarian-language films
1983 drama films
Films directed by György Szomjas
Hungarian drama films